Geneina Airport  is an airport serving Geneina, in the Darfur region of Sudan.

Airlines and destinations

Geneina Air Base

Geneina hosts Sudanese Air Force Helicopter Squadron (Mil Mi-8)

References

External links 

Airports in Sudan
World War II airfields in Sudan
Airfields of the United States Army Air Forces Air Transport Command in Central and South Africa
Airfields of the United States Army Air Forces